The 2017 Western Carolina Catamounts team represented Western Carolina University as a member of the Southern Conference (SoCon) during the 2017 NCAA Division I FCS football season. Led by sixth-year head coach Mark Speir, the Catamounts compiled an overall record of 7–5 with a mark of 5–3 in conference play, placing fourth in the SoCon. Western Carolina played their home games at Bob Waters Field at E. J. Whitmire Stadium in Cullowhee, North Carolina.

Schedule

Game summaries

at Hawaii

Davidson

at Gardner–Webb

Samford

at Chattanooga

at Wofford

East Tennessee State

at VMI

Furman

at The Citadel

Mercer

at North Carolina

Ranking movements

References

Western Carolina
Western Carolina Catamounts football seasons
Western Carolina Catamounts football